Georges Scapini (1893–1976) was a French lawyer and politician. He served as a member of the Chamber of Deputies from 1928 to 1942. He served in the government of Marshal Pétain and was tried as a Nazi collaborator in 1952.

References

1893 births
1976 deaths
Politicians from Paris
Democratic and Social Action politicians
Republican Independents
Members of the 14th Chamber of Deputies of the French Third Republic
Members of the 15th Chamber of Deputies of the French Third Republic
Members of the 16th Chamber of Deputies of the French Third Republic
People of Vichy France
20th-century French lawyers
French military personnel of World War I
French collaborators with Nazi Germany